Hydroxybenzoic acid may refer to several related chemical compounds:

 2-Hydroxybenzoic acid (salicylic acid, o-hydroxybenzoic acid)
 3-Hydroxybenzoic acid (m-hydroxybenzoic acid)
 4-Hydroxybenzoic acid (p-hydroxybenzoic acid)

See also
 Dihydroxybenzoic acids
 Trihydroxybenzoic acids
 Phenolic acid